Jorge Andrés Goncalves, now spelling his last name Goncalvez, (born June 14, 1991) is a Venezuelan racing driver from Los Teques.

Racing career

Early career
After karting, Goncalvez began his auto racing career in Formula Renault Campus France in 2007, finishing 14th. In 2008 he raced in Formula BMW USA for the Apex-HBR Racing Team and finished 7th. In 2009 Goncalvez moved to the Star Mazda Championship with AIM Autosport and finished 9th. After winning the 2009–2010 Formula Car Challenge presented by Goodyear Winter Series with Team Apex, Goncalvez returned to Team Apex for the full 2010 campaign. He finished fourth in points with five second-place finishes but no wins or poles.

Indy Lights
In 2011 Goncalvez signed with Belardi Auto Racing to compete in IndyCar's Firestone Indy Lights series. He captured four podium finishes, all on ovals, including a runner-up finish at the New Hampshire Motor Speedway and finished fifth in points. His best finish on a road or street course was a fourth place at Barber Motorsports Park. He signed on with Belardi to return to the series for the 2012 Indy Lights season. Goncalvez's performance regressed in 2012, which saw him failing to reach the podium and finishing last among drivers who competed in every race. He will return to the team and the series for a third season in 2013.

Racing record

American open–wheel racing results 
(key)

Star Mazda Championship

Indy Lights

References

External links
Jorge Goncalvez's official website 

1991 births
Venezuelan racing drivers
French F4 Championship drivers
Formula BMW USA drivers
Indy Pro 2000 Championship drivers
Indy Lights drivers
Living people
24 Hours of Daytona drivers
Rolex Sports Car Series drivers
People from Los Teques
Belardi Auto Racing drivers
Starworks Motorsport drivers
Meyer Shank Racing drivers